Irakere & Trabuco - En Vivo, Poliedro de Caracas, Mayo 14' 81 is a Vinyl-LP live album released in 1982.

The Cuban band Irakere of Chucho Valdés and  El Trabuco Venezolano led by Alberto Naranjo shared a stage three times – twice in Venezuela at the Poliedro de Caracas, in 1979 and 1981 (two concerts each year), and once at the Teatro Carlos Marx in Havana, Cuba in 1981. This recording shows the first of the two face-to-face historic encounters between Irakere and Trabuco that were held in Caracas on May 14 and 15 of 1981. The tone is set by Carlos Daniel Palacios singing the opening Tres días, a tune composed by Valdés and arranged by Naranjo for his Trabuco, as a warm greeting to the foreign guests. Highlights include a rejuvenated version of El Cumaco de San Juan, a traditional Venezuelan merengue metido en clave this time by sonero Joe Ruiz, followed by Formas Libres – a cool and spacious mix of free jazz experimentation and simple composed elements conceived by Naranjo. The other side starts with a Valdés arrangement of La Molinaria de Paisello [sic], based in a variation created by Ludwig van Beethoven on La Molinara theme composed by Giovanni Paisiello in 1788. In this track, tenor sax and flautist Carlos Averhoff and guitarist Carlos Emilio Morales combine to provide a touching performance of jazz and academic. The last track A romper el coco, with the energetic vocalization of Oscar Valdés and Morales soloing on guitar, is quite enjoyable from beginning to end. This album has a significant amount of musical variety and finds Irakere and Trabuco in fine form.

Track listing

Credits

El Trabuco Venezolano
 Alberto Naranjo - drums, arranger, director
 Samuel del Real - acoustic piano
 Lorenzo Barriendos - bass guitar
 José Navarro - timbales 
 Felipe Rengifo - congas
 William Mora - bongos
 Luis Arias - lead trumpet
 Gustavo Aranguren - trumpet
 José Díaz F. - trumpet and flugel horn
 Manolo Pérez - trumpet and flugel horn
 Rafael Silva - lead trombone
 Alejandro Pérez Palma - trombone
 Leopoldo Escalante - trombone
 Carlos Daniel Palacios - lead singer and chorus
 Joe Ruiz - lead singer and chorus
 Carlos Espósito - lead singer and chorus

Irakere
 Chucho Valdés - keyboards, arranger, director
 Carlos Emilio Morales - electric guitar, percussion
 Carlos del Puerto - bass guitar, chorus
 Enrique Plá - drums, percussion
 Jorge Alfonzo - congas, percussion
 Juan Munguía - trumpet, flugel horn, valve trombone
 Jorge Varona - trumpet, flugel horn, percussion
 Germán Velasco - soprano and alto saxophones, flute, chorus
 Carlos Averhoff - soprano and tenor saxophones, flute, chorus
 José Luis Cortés - baritone saxophone, flute, chorus
 Oscar Valdés - lead vocalist, percussion

Other credits
 Artistic producers: Orlando Montiel and Alberto Naranjo
 Production manager: Prudencio Sánchez
 Staff coordinator: Freddy Sanz
 Graphic design: Miguel Angel Briceño and Orlando Montiel
 Label: Integra C. A. IG-10.039, 1982
 Place of recording: Poliedro de Caracas
 Recording engineer: Gustavo Quintero
 Mixing: Gustavo Quintero, Orlando Montiel and Alberto Naranjo, at Estudios del Este
 Produced in Caracas, Venezuela, 1982

External links
Salsa2u.com
Sincopa.com
Venciclopedia.com - Irakere & Trabuco, En Vivo Poliedro de Caracas Mayo 14 '81

Alberto Naranjo albums
1982 live albums